Ukraina is the Ukrainian, Russian, or Polish name for Ukraine.

Ukraina may also refer to:

Places
 Ukraina, Łódź Voivodeship, a village in central Poland
 Ukraina, Lesser Poland Voivodeship, a village in southern Poland
 Ukraina No. 513, Alberta, Canada; a municipal district
 1709 Ukraina, a main-belt asteroid

Facilities and structures
 Palace "Ukraine", Kyiv, Ukraine; a theatre
 Ukraina Stadium, Lviv, Ukraine
 Hotel Ukraina (disambiguation)

Transportation and vehicles
 Ukraina-class motorship, a class of Russian ships
 Ukraina, the first ship in the Ukraina-class motorship
 Ukrainian cruiser Ukraina, a Slava-class missile cruiser

Other uses
 Ukraina.ru, a media site operated by Rossiya Segodnya owned by the Russian government

See also

 Soviet cruiser Chervona Ukraina
 Soviet battleship Sovietskaya Ukraina
 Ukraine (disambiguation)
 Ukrainia (disambiguation)
 Ukrainian (disambiguation)
 Ukrainians (disambiguation)